Garrycastle is a Gaelic football club from the town of Athlone in County Westmeath, Republic of Ireland.

The club was founded in 1981 after GAA fans in the area saw the need for a second club in Athlone to cater for the growing population of the town. They won their first Westmeath senior football championship in 2001, and their first Leinster club football title in 2011 after a last-minute free from second-half substitute Conor Cosgrove.
They are the first and only Westmeath club to win the title.
In 2004, Dessie Dolan was the first player from the club to be awarded an All Star. Dessie received an award for Westmeath footballer of the year for 2015 after his Man of the Match performance against Meath in the Leinster Championship.
On 17 March 2012, they played in their first All-Ireland Senior Club Football Championship final against Crossmaglen Rangers at Croke Park. The match finished in a draw on a 1-12 to 0-15 scoreline. Crossmaglen went on to win the replay to claim their sixth title. They are the current Westmeath senior football champions, beating St Loman’s 2-13 to 3-06 on 13 October 2019.

Notable players
Dessie Dolan
James Dolan
David O'Shaughnessy
Cathal Mullin
Michael Monaghan
Doron Harte
John Gaffey
Lynchy
Andy3451 ( Andrew Monaghan )
MCurleyGCastle

Honours
Westmeath Senior Football Championship:
Winner (8): 2001, 2002, 2004, 2009, 2010, 2011, 2014, 2019
Leinster Senior Club Football Championship:
Winner (1): 2011
 Westmeath Intermediate Football Championships: (1)
 1997
 Westmeath Junior Football Championships:''' (3)
 1982, 1993, 2011
 Westmeath Division 1 Leagues (8): 
 2001, 2002, 2003, 2008, 2009, 2012, 2018, 2019
 Westmeath Division 2 League (1):
 1995
 Westmeath Division 3 League (1):
 2012

References

External links
Official Website
GAA Info Website

Gaelic games clubs in County Westmeath
Sport in Athlone